Women Handball International League (WHIL), also known as Czech-Slovak Interliga, is a supranational championship created in 2002 that serves as the highest women's handball league in the Czech Republic and Slovakia. Following the end of the championship the four best-placed teams from each country play separate play-offs to determine the national champions. The inaugural edition was also contested by Hypo Niederösterreich from Austria.

The number of teams in the WHIL has ranged from eleven in 2005 and 2009 to fourteen in 2011. As of the 2016-17 season, it is currently contested by thirteen teams - seven from the Czech Republic and six from Slovakia. After Austria's win in its only appearance, Slovakia dominated the following six seasons, while the Czech Republic has won the next four editions. Iuventa Michalovce is the most successful team in the competition with eight titles, followed by Slavia Prague and Slovan Duslo Šaľa with two.

2016/17 Season participants

The following 13 clubs compete in the WHIL during the 2016–17 season.

WHIL Champions

 2003 :  Hypo Niederösterreich 
 2004 :  HK Slovan Duslo Šaľa 
 2005 :  Iuventa Michalovce 
 2006 :  Iuventa Michalovce (2)
 2007 :  Iuventa Michalovce (3)
 2008 :  HK Slovan Duslo Šaľa (2)
 2009 :  Iuventa Michalovce (4)
 2010 :  Slavia Prague
 2011 :  Slavia Prague (2) 
 2012 :  HK Veselí nad Moravou

 2013 :  Baník Most 
 2014 :  Iuventa Michalovce (5)
 2015 :  Iuventa Michalovce (6)
 2016 :  Iuventa Michalovce (7)
 2017 :  Iuventa Michalovce (8)
 2018 :  Baník Most (2) 
 2019 :  Iuventa Michalovce (9)
 2020: Not awarded
 2021:  Baník Most (3) 
 2022:  Iuventa Michalovce (10)

References

Women's handball leagues
Women's handball in the Czech Republic
2002 establishments in the Czech Republic
Sports leagues established in 2002
Women's handball in Slovakia
Women's sports leagues in the Czech Republic
Women's sports leagues in Slovakia
Multi-national professional sports leagues